Coldenia, named after C. Colden, is a monotypic genus of flowering plants traditionally included in the borage family, Boraginaceae sensu lato. It was assigned to the subfamily Ehretioideae, but molecular data revealed it to be more closely related to the genus Cordia, so that other authors placed in Cordioideae. Subsequently, it was placed in its own family, Coldeniaceae, within the Boraginales order, by the Boraginales Working Group.

The sole species is Coldenia procumbens.

References

Bibliography 

 

Cordioideae
Monotypic asterid genera
Boraginaceae genera